Saint-Euphraise-et-Clairizet is a commune in the Marne département in north-eastern France.

At the time of the French Revolution, the commune was called Ardrecours.

See also
Communes of the Marne department
Montagne de Reims Regional Natural Park

References

Sainteuphraiseetclairizet